Ronald Reagan UCLA Medical Center (also commonly referred to as UCLA Medical Center, "RRMC" or "Ronald Reagan") is a hospital located on the campus of the University of California, Los Angeles, in Westwood, Los Angeles, California, United States. It is currently ranked the 5th best hospital in the United States by U.S. News & World Report, and 2nd best in California and the West Coast (behind Cedars-Sinai Medical Center - also in Los Angeles). The hospital provides tertiary care to Los Angeles and the surrounding communities.

UCLA Medical Center has research centers covering nearly all major specialties of medicine and nursing as well as dentistry and is the primary teaching hospital for the David Geffen School of Medicine at UCLA and the UCLA School of Nursing. The hospital's emergency department is a certified level I trauma center for both adult and pediatric patients. Ronald Reagan UCLA Medical Center is a constituent part of UCLA Health, a comprehensive consortium of research hospitals and medical institutes affiliated with UCLA, including Ronald Reagan UCLA Medical Center, UCLA Medical Center, Santa Monica, Resnick Neuropsychiatric Hospital at UCLA, UCLA Mattel Children's Hospital, and UCLA Medical Group.

Collectively, the hospitals and specialty-care facilities of the UCLA Health system make it among the most comprehensive and advanced healthcare systems in the United States. The hospital has been ranked in the top twenty in 15 of the 16 medical specialties ranked by the US News ranking. Ten of those specialties were ranked in the top ten.  In 2005, the American Nurses Credentialing Center granted the medical center "Magnet" status.

History
On June 29, 2008, the new Ronald Reagan UCLA Medical Center opened and became fully operational, replacing the older facilities across the street. The older hospital complex had suffered moderate interior structural damage in the 1994 Northridge earthquake. Because numerous hospitals in the area were severely damaged during the Northridge earthquake and injured people had to be transported long distances for emergency care, the state of California passed SB1953, an amendment to an older law requiring all hospitals to move their acute care and intensive care units into earthquake-resistant buildings by 2008.

Originally budgeted at $598 million in 1998, construction began in 1999 and was completed in 2004. Cost overruns and construction delays attributed to rising construction costs and design changes due to medical advances resulted in the price of the building increasing to $829 million. Equipment purchased for the new building increased the total cost to over $1 billion. The Federal Emergency Management Agency contributed $432 million in earthquake relief funds to the project, and the state of California contributed $44 million. Private donations raised over $300 million for the project, including $150 million in President Reagan's name. The new building was constructed to withstand an 8.0 magnitude earthquake, one of the first buildings in California built to the most recent seismic standards.

The new  hospital is named after the President of the United States and Governor of California Ronald Reagan (1911–2004). It was designed by C.C. "Didi" Pei of Pei Partnership Architects in collaboration with his father, Pritzker Prize-winning architect I.M. Pei. The hospital will contain fewer patient beds (525) than the one it replaces. Patient beds in the intensive-care units will be accessible to nurses and physicians from 360 degrees, and surgical floor plans will be modular, allowing them to be expanded and reconfigured as medical technology evolves. The hospital is sheathed with mechanically honed, cream-colored, horizontally grained travertine marble panels sold at below-market-rate cost by Carlo Marrioti, the owner of an Italian quarry whose cancer was cured at UCLA. The travertine elements were fastened to a sophisticated interlocking panelized aluminum cladding system developed by Benson Industries of Portland, Oregon. The building envelope is designed to resist and survive severe seismic events and maintain excellent resistance to air and water infiltration.

The older center itself is a sprawling 11-story brick building designed by Welton Becket.  It is considered a landmark of early modern architecture. The center was built in several phases, the first of which was completed in 1953. The hospital has a "tic-tac-toe" layout of intersecting wings, creating a series of courtyards throughout the complex. The first floor is unusual in that most of its walls are completely clad in a thick layer of naturally-weathered, unfilled, travertine, creating an unusual "organic" appearance. The exterior architecture is very simple (as with many Becket designs), consisting of a red brick wall with horizontal bands of stainless-steel louvers over the windows to keep direct sunlight from heating the building.

Some of the old complex will be torn down, and some of it will be renovated and turned into office space when it is no longer an operational hospital. The law does not require that all parts of a hospital be made earthquake-safe, only the most important parts. Much of the extensive travertine wall cladding from the building's interior will most likely be salvaged and re-used.

Facilities

Area covered for the paramedics
Ronald Reagan UCLA Medical Center has covered paramedic areas for the Fire Department.
 Beverly Hills F.D. – RA 1, 2 and 3
 Los Angeles Fire Department – RA 5, 19, 34, 37, 43, 58, 59, 63, 92, 94 and 95.
 Los Angeles County Fire Department – Squads 71, 88, 89 and 172.

Resnick Neuropsychiatric Hospital at UCLA
The Stewart & Lynda Resnick Neuropsychiatric Hospital at UCLA is a 74-bed acute care psychiatric hospital located within the Ronald Reagan UCLA Medical Center.  Following a donation, the hospital was named for Lynda Resnick and her husband. The hospital has a pediatrics unit, adolescent unit, an adult unit, and a geriatrics unit

UCLA Mattel Children's Hospital

UCLA Mattel Children's Hospital at Ronald Reagan UCLA Medical Center is a pediatric acute care hospital located in Los Angeles, California. The hospital has 156 beds. It is affiliated with the University of California, Los Angeles David Geffen School of Medicine, and is a member of UCLA Health. The hospital provides comprehensive pediatric specialties and subspecialties to pediatric patients aged 0–21 throughout California. UCLA Mattel Children's Hospital features a pediatric level 1 trauma center. The UCLA Mattel Children's Hospital is located on the third and fifth floors of the Ronald Reagan UCLA Medical Center.

Death of Michael Jackson 

On June 25, 2009, American singer Michael Jackson died from acute propofol and benzodiazepine intoxication at his home. Conrad Murray, his personal physician, had given Jackson various medications to help him sleep at his rented mansion in Holmby Hills, Los Angeles. Paramedics received a 911 call at 12:22 p.m. Pacific time (19:22 UTC), and arrived three minutes later. Jackson was not breathing and CPR was performed.  Resuscitation efforts continued en route to Ronald Reagan UCLA Medical Center, and for more than an hour after arriving there, but were unsuccessful, and Jackson was pronounced dead at 2:26 pm Pacific time (21:26 UTC).

Notable people

Physicians
 David Ho
 Louis Ignarro – UCLA faculty member and pharmacologist Louis Ignarro's discovery of one of the most important signaling molecules in the human body, nitric oxide, led to his winning the Nobel Prize in medicine in 1998. This discovery revolutionized the fields of cardiopulmonary medicine and immunology.
 Patrick Soon-Shiong

Births
 Beyoncé and Jay Z’s twins Rumi and Sir Carter (June 13, 2017)
 Maud Elizabeth Daphne Marina (First American Born British Royal)

Deaths

 Freddie Prinze on January 29, 1977
 Jack Soo on January 11, 1979 
 Jack Haley on June 6, 1979
 John Wayne on June 11, 1979
 Pat Buttram on January 8, 1994
 Friz Freleng on May 26, 1995
Mary Wickes on October 22, 1995
Marlon Brando on July 1, 2004
 Rodney Dangerfield on October 5, 2004 
Charles Nelson Reilly on May 25, 2007
 Harvey Korman on May 29, 2008
 Nina Foch on December 5, 2008
 Wayne Allwine on May 18, 2009
 Ed McMahon on June 23, 2009
 Michael Jackson on June 25, 2009 
 Andrew Breitbart on March 1, 2012
Richard Dawson on June 2, 2012
Zsa Zsa Gabor on December 18, 2016
Carrie Fisher on December 27, 2016
 Adam West on June 9, 2017
Martin Landau on July 15, 2017 
Charlie Robinson on July 11, 2021
Eve Babitz on December 17, 2021
James Caan on July 6, 2022

Controversy

Mo cell line controversy
UCLA Medical Center is well known as the defendant in a famous Supreme Court of California case, Moore v. Regents of the University of California, 51 Cal. 3d 120 (1990).  The court decided that patient John Moore had no property rights in the immensely profitable "Mo" cell line which UCLA researchers had discovered when they removed his cancerous spleen.

CRE outbreak
As of 2015, seven people had been infected by and two have died from carbapenem-resistant Enterobacteriaceae, a drug-resistant superbug. A total of 179 people were exposed to the bacteria via two duodenoscopes which were not disinfected sufficiently. The outbreak is not serious, however, as the superbug is not a serious threat to healthy patients, and cannot be transmitted easily through its own means. The risk of infection via duodenoscope is very low as well, with procedures being performed on over 500,000 individuals between 2013 and 2014, and only 135 cases of CRE being reported as a result. Some doctors believe several more outbreaks of this nature are imminent. Since the outbreak, demands have been made to the FDA to improve their regulation and sanitation of medical devices.

See also

Harbor-UCLA Medical Center
Olive View-UCLA Medical Center
UCLA Medical Center, Santa Monica
UCLA Health, overarching administrative structure, comprising the UCLA hospitals.
UCLA Health Care, the billing and administrative organ of the UCLA Health System.
UCLA Medical Group, a health care group of physicians affiliated with UCLA.

References

External links
Ronald Reagan UCLA Medical Center
UCLA Health
This hospital in the CA Healthcare Atlas A project by OSHPD

UCLA Medical Center
Teaching hospitals in California
Westwood, Los Angeles
UCLA Medical Center
UCLA Medical Center
Hospital buildings completed in 2008
Reagan
Medical Center
1955 establishments in California
Healthcare in Los Angeles
Science and technology in Greater Los Angeles
Trauma centers
UCLA Health